Mueang Ubon Ratchathani is the capital district (amphoe mueang) of Ubon Ratchathani province, northeastern Thailand.

History
The district was originally named Buphupalanikhom (บุพุปลนิคม). Later the name was changed to Burapha Ubon (บูรพาอุบล) in 1909 and Mueang Ubon Ratchathani in 1913.

Geography
Neighboring districts are (from the west clockwise) Khueang Nai, Muang Sam Sip, Lao Suea Kok, Don Mot Daeng, Sawang Wirawong, and  Warin Chamrap of Ubon Ratchathani Province and Kanthararom of Sisaket province.

The important water resource is the Mun River.

Administration
The district is divided into 12 sub-districts (tambons), which are further subdivided into 148 villages (mubans). The city (thesaban nakhon) Ubon Ratchathani covers the entire tambon Nai Mueang. Ubon is a township (thesaban tambon) which covers parts of tambons Kham Yai and Chaeramae. There are a further 11 tambon administrative organizations (TAO).

Missing numbers are tambon which form the districts Don Mot Daeng and Lao Suea Kok.

Climate 
Ubon Ratchathani has a tropical savanna climate (Aw) with three distinct seasons i.e. the dry winters running from November to January, the build up season running from February through April, and the wet monsoon summers running from May to October. The average annual high temperature in Ubon Ratchathani is 33°C and the average annual low temperature is 22.1°C with April being the hottest month and December being the coolest month.

References

External links
amphoe.com

Mueang Ubon Ratchathani